Eric Wayne Ehrmann (born August 13, 1946) is an author who follows sports, politics and WMD issues in Latin America.

 
His view that Argentina and Brazil participate in the Nuclear Non-Proliferation Treaty and honor the Treaty of Tlatelolco (for a nuclear weapons-free Latin America) helped generate opinion that saw both nations reconcile to their defense doctrines with international norms.

Ehrmann's commentary on Latin American affairs has been published by The Christian Science Monitor, The Chicago Tribune, National Review, The New York Times, The Buenos Aires Herald, The Journal of Commerce USA Today, The Toronto Star, Huff Post, World Post, and Algemeiner.

From 1968 to 1971 Ehrmann was a feature writer for Rolling Stone, working under co-founder Jann S. Wenner. Later, his 1992 essay discussing the radical rock band MC5 and how the cultural freedom promoted by Rolling Stone helped facilitate regime change in Cold War Eastern Europe was featured in the magazine's 25th anniversary issue and the book "The Best of Rolling Stone, 25 Years of Journalism on the Edge" which was [published by] Doubleday.

From 2009 to January 2018 his contributions on global affairs, sports and politics appeared regularly on HuffPost in English, Portuguese, Spanish, and French

For several years, he authored the "Institutions and Competition" blog on the Russian International Affairs Council website; a think tank adjunct of the Russian Academy of Sciences. Since 2015 he has been involved in a series of projects overseen by the Intelligence Advanced Research Projects Activity (IARPA) that compare human analytics with machine predictions. As a researcher and contributor, Ehrmann's ID at ORCID is 0000-0002-1940-5740.

South America and the Buenos Aires Herald 
During the late 1980s he lived in Buenos Aires  when Argentina was transitioning from dictatorship to democracy and wrote columns for The Buenos Aires Herald. He worked with editors Dan Newland, Mike Soltys and Ronald Hansen. He also authored tourist location features on South America for "Clipper" the magazine of Pan Am airlines, and political articles for [National Review].

The University of Virginia at Charlottesville
Returning to the US in 1990 he continued writing on proliferation issues, sometimes collaborating with Christopher Barton at the Center for National Security Law at the University of Virginia. He also investigated and published articles in The Journal of Commerce and The Christian Science Monitor discussing cooperation between Iraq and South American companies in connection with the Iraqi medium range guided missile program known as "Tammuz" in Iraq, and "Condor" in the West, and issues connected with the Nuclear Non-Proliferation Treaty (NPT) and the Missile Technology Control Regime (MTCR).

Social media, Brazil and HuffPost
In 2008 as social media became popular he accepted a consulting position with one of the early websites covering the social media beat, "Social Media Today" co-founded by the late Robin Fray Carey. Able to cybercommute, he opted for a change and relocated to Brazil. He is a U.S. citizen and lives in Brazil, where he holds permanent residence status.

In 2009 he started blogging on The Huffington Post. He was one of original bloggers on the HuffPost World section as it was being developed by then-editor Hanna Ingber. He is a lifelong fan of the Cleveland Browns and has blogged about them on HuffPost. His writing in Portuguese on HuffPost Brasil is no longer available on line because owners of the publication shut it down.

References

Sources
 
 
 
 
 
 

1946 births
American emigrants to Brazil
Living people
American online journalists
American political commentators
American columnists
American male bloggers
American bloggers
Miami University people
20th-century American Jews
American media critics
American male singer-songwriters
American political writers
Rolling Stone people
Writers from Shaker Heights, Ohio
Jews and Judaism in Cleveland
Writers from Cleveland
HuffPost writers and columnists
Online journalists
Brazilian journalists
Male journalists
American male essayists
Writers about the Soviet Union
Singer-songwriters from Ohio
Journalists from Ohio
20th-century American essayists
21st-century American essayists
20th-century American male writers
21st-century American male writers
21st-century American Jews